The discography for the American heavy metal band White Zombie.

Albums

Studio albums

Remix albums

Compilation albums

Extended plays

Singles

Official singles

Promotional singles

Music videos

References
General

 

Specific

Discography
Heavy metal group discographies
Discographies of American artists